Outside Edge is a British sitcom by Richard Harris that starred Brenda Blethyn, Robert Daws, Josie Lawrence and Timothy Spall. Three series and a Christmas special were produced by Central Independent Television and were broadcast on ITV from 24 March 1994 to 13 February 1996. The series was adapted from Harris' original stage play which premiered in 1979; upon adapting it for television, Harris expanded on the characters' back stories and introduced more plot lines that were absent in the original play. The series focuses on the lives of two couples with contrasting attitudes, the uptight and conservative Roger (Daws) and Miriam Dervish (Blethyn) with the bohemian and adventurous Kevin (Spall) and Maggie Costello (Lawrence) and their involvement with the local Brent Park Cricket team who meet every Saturday. Other members of the cricket team are also dealt with, from the lecherous womaniser Dennis Broadley (Denis Lill), timid and naive Nigel (Nigel Pegram), snobbish solicitor Alex Harrington (Ben Daniels/ Chris Lang) and browbeaten husband and later father Bob Willis (Jeremy Nicholas/ Michael Jayston), along with a number of other characters who also regularly appear through the series' run. The series was one of the more successful ITV sitcoms during the 1990s, and it won a number of awards at the time, it won awards for Best Comedy Drama and Best Actress in 1994 for Brenda Blethyn at the British Comedy Awards in 1994, as well as a Writer's Guild of Great Britain award for best situation comedy in 1994 for its writer/ creator Richard Harris. Moreover, both Robert Daws and Josie Lawrence were nominated for Best Actor and Best Actress at the British Comedy Awards in 1995. The series was not the first time that the play had been adapted for television:  it had been previously adapted as a one-off television play that was shown in 1982, which starred Paul Eddington (Roger), Prunella Scales (Mim), Jonathan Lynn (Kevin) and Maureen Lipman (Maggie) in the principal roles.

Cast

Main 
Brenda Blethyn as Miriam Dervish
Robert Daws as Roger Dervish
Josie Lawrence as Maggie Costello
Timothy Spall as Kevin Costello

Co-stars 
Denis Lill as Dennis Broadley
Nigel Pegram as Nigel
Jeremy Nicholas (Series 1) and Michael Jayston (Series 2–3) as Bob Willis
Ben Daniels (Series 1) and Chris Lang (Series 2–3) as Alex Harrington

Recurring cast 
Tracy Brabin as Ginnie Willis
Katy Landis as Sharon (Series 1–2)
Hillary Crane as Shirley Broadley (Series 2–3)
May Boak as Nigel's Mother (Series 2–3)
Roy Holder as Fred (Series 2)
Rosemary Martin as Sonia (Series 2)
Amanda Waring as Sophie (Christmas Special, Series 3)
David Belcher as Vicar (Series 3)
Duncan Knowles as Clive (Series 3)

Plot 
Roger Dervish (Daws) is the astute and bossy captain of the local cricket team who thinks, talks and dreams about the game all the time. He enlists his timid wife, Mim (Blethyn), who organises the club's teas at every match. She is also constantly ordered around by her husband for everything ranging from catering and equipment to transport to every home and away game. Their regimented lifestyle is turned upside down when on one match day they are introduced to the vivacious and outgoing Maggie Costello (Lawrence), wife of Kevin (Spall), a bowler from Roger's cricket team. A friendship soon develops between Mim and Maggie, who encourages Mim to come out of her shell and become more assertive towards Roger. The ensuing revelation of home truths and long-hidden secrets tears through their staid lifestyle like wildfire. For Mim and Roger things will never be quite the same.

Characters 
Miriam Dervish played by Brenda Blethyn

Miriam, otherwise known as Mim, is the long-suffering wife of Roger and assistant to his constant needs both at the cricket ground and at home. She used to be involved in the local operatic society but had to give up her promising career to raise a family and look after her pushy husband. She is timid, kind and quite forgiving towards people and tries her best to avoid confrontation with others, which can sometimes be to her disadvantage and lead to further problems. At the beginning of the series she lives a relatively sedate and humdrum lifestyle, which mainly consists of looking after her husband and organising the cricket club's teas every Saturday. However her efforts are rarely appreciated and she is often harangued by Roger. Her life is turned around when she meets Maggie, who encourages her to become more confident and express her feelings more, along with being more assertive towards Roger and less submissive towards his behaviour.

Roger Dervish played by Robert Daws

Bossy, opinionated and always to the task, Roger is the Captain of his local Cricket team, a role he takes very seriously. Outside of work, most of his life revolves around organising and planning the weekly fixtures, sometimes his excessiveness and attention to detail can be an annoyance towards others, and when things go wrong with the Cricket team or at home he is rarely able to handle it well. His constant obsessiveness about Cricket leads to Roger neglecting his wife, to the point where it almost leads to a breakdown in their marriage. Roger merely sees Mim as subservient to his whims and needs whether it's at home or at the Cricket club, and he rarely reciprocates her efforts. He is often frosty and brusque towards others, which often leads to confrontation; and his old fashioned stiff upper lip attitude masks his inability to express his feelings. Despite his failings, he is fairly efficient at organising the local Cricket club, although his compulsiveness can be seen as a sign that he takes his role as Captain too seriously.

Maggie Costello played by Josie Lawrence

In contrast to Mim, she is outgoing, flirtatious, brash and frequently expresses her feelings about people. She is married to Kevin, a bowler of the local Cricket team; she is deeply infatuated with her husband and their passionate relationship frequently leads to public displays of affection, which often causes disquiet among the other members of the club. She lives a carefree Bohemian lifestyle and dresses in revealing tops and outfits as a means of expressing her sensuality, however her extroverted behaviour masks her sadness and inability to come to terms with the concept that she and Kevin may not be able to have children. She is resourceful, generous and a jack of all trades whether it's mending a fence, fixing a car or cleaning out the gutters, although she is utterly hopeless in the kitchen. Over the course of the series, she strikes up a friendship with Mim when she starts attending her husband's Cricket matches. She encourages Mim to break out her shell and become more assertive towards her husband and reach out to her inner confidence.

Kevin Costello played by Timothy Spall

Unlike his wife, he can be seen as shy and is often submissive to her dominating behaviour, he will do anything for his wife whether it's trying on dresses for size or laying down patio slabs in the garden. Despite their constant squabbles, he is completely in love with his wife, and their fervent relationship is often fiery and expressive. He is the pole opposite to Roger, he is laidback, reticent and disorganised, he frequently likes to lie down and avoid asserting himself in difficult situations, often to the consternation of others, particularly Roger. He has a kind hearted and genial nature, although he often relishes in winding up other members of the club with outlandish lies which lead to all sorts of trouble. Besides his talent for Cricket, he is a genius in the kitchen and regularly rustles up gourmet meals for himself and Maggie. And although he has a frequently tempestuous relationship with his wife, he is always willing to defend Maggie when criticised by others, as well as support and stand by her through thick and thin.

Episodes

Series 1 (1994)

Series 2 (1995)

Christmas Special (1995)

Series 3 (1996)

Development 
In 1991, Richard Harris wrote a pilot for a potential TV series adaption for 'Outside Edge' and submitted it to Central Independent Television, sometime later the script eventually found its way to the attention of his former colleague and producer Paula Burdon. As Harris recalled for an interview with Suzan Leavy from The Stage Magazine in 1994 "I was quite surprised that Paula commissioned me to write six episodes before Vernon Lawrence (TV producer) had even seen it." He continued by stating "it was quite strange because I sent the script in about three years ago, so you wait around all that time and suddenly it's all systems go and you are told to go away and write six more episodes'. Harris later admitted in another interview that the first series was largely based on the original stage play, with the subsequent two series adding to the original idea and following up on the plot lines and characters established in the first series.

Location Filming 
Much of the series was filmed on location around Northamptonshire using a single camera setup which was unusual for sitcoms at the time, it was also one of the earliest TV sitcoms to use be shot and processed on filmized videotape, which has become the norm for most sitcoms since the early 2000s. The setting for the Cricket club changed each series, during Series 1 the scenes at the Cricket club were filmed at Thrumpton Cricklet Club in Thrumpton, Nottinghamshire  during the Summer of 1993; for Series 2 this was switched to Wollaton Cricket Club  in Wollaton, Nottinghamshire and for the 3rd and final series it was filmed at Colston Bassett, Northamptonshire; unlike the first two series which were filmed at existing Cricket clubs, a club hut and pitch were purposefully built by the production crew as a means of avoiding disruption to filming by resident Cricket teams which had been an issue before in previous series. The constant changes of location for the Cricket club was finally acknowledged in the Series 2 finale 'The Club Meeting' when Roger announces that the club will moving to a new home ground. Other filming locations included West Bridgford, Nottinghamshire for the scenes at Mim and Roger's house, the Hotel de Paris in Cromer, Norfolk for the episode 'The Night Before Cromer', and Aslockton railway station in Asklockton, Northamptonshire for the scene in the Series 3 opener 'The New Pitch' where Kevin and Maggie meet real life Cricketer, Godfrey Evans on the station platform, who plays himself in the episode. Moreover, filming was done overseas in Corfu, for the 1995 Christmas Special, 'OK - Corfu? Fair Enough'.

Home Media 
The first series was originally released on VHS on the 6 June 1994 by the Video Collection and Central Video, the two subsequent series and the 1995 Christmas Special were also released in the ensuing years on VHS by Carlton Home Entertainment. The entire series was eventually released as a DVD boxset on the 6th October 2008  by Network, also included within the boxset was the 1982 one off television play.

References

External links 
 Outside Edge at IMDb
 Outside Edge at British Classic Comedy
 Outside Edge at British Comedy Guide
 Outside Edge - Original Stage Play

ITV sitcoms
1994 British television series debuts
1996 British television series endings
1990s British comedy television series
Television series by ITV Studios
Television shows produced by Central Independent Television
English-language television shows